Ma and Pa Kettle at Waikiki is a 1955 American comedy film directed by Lee Sholem. It is the seventh installment of Universal-International's Ma and Pa Kettle series starring Marjorie Main and Percy Kilbride in his final starring role.

Plot
In July 1952, the Kettles help out cousin Rodney Kettle in Hawaii with his pineapple business. Ma and Pa get acquainted with blue-blooded Mrs. Andrews who thinks the Kettles are the "lowliest" people she has met. This is Percy Kilbride's last appearance as Pa Kettle, and his final movie as well.

Cousin Rodney (Loring Smith) has paid Ma and Pa Kettle's way to Hawaii, under the false assumption that Kilbride is a business genius
who can help increase stalled business at the family pineapple factory.

Pa DOES come up with a solution, although purely by accident.

The Kettles also meet a Hawaiian family who are their "mirror image"---hard working Mother (Hilo Hattie), lazy Father (Lung),
and twelve children named after the months of the year. Pa Kettle is naturally curious as to what will happen when the next child comes 
along.

Unscrupulous business rivals kidnap Pa, who remains innocently oblivious of his danger. Both large families converge on the
hideout for a slapstick rescue mission;with Hawaiian food as the chief ammunition.

Cast
Marjorie Main as Ma Kettle
Percy Kilbride as Pa Kettle
Lori Nelson as Rosie Kettle
Byron Palmer as Bob Baxter
Russell Johnson as Eddie Nelson
Hilo Hattie as Mama Lotus
Loring Smith as Rodney Kettle
Lowell Gilmore as Robert Coates
Mabel Albertson as Teresa Andrews
Fay Roope as Fulton Andrews
Oliver Blake as Geoduck
Teddy Hart as Crowbar
Esther Dale as Birdie Hicks
Claudette Thornton as Rodney Kettle's Secretary
George Arglen as Willie Kettle
Myron Healey (Kidnapper)
Ben Welden (Kidnapper)
Richard Reeves (Kidnapper)
Charles Lung (Papa Lotus)

Production
Although made in 1952, the film was not released for another 3 years, by which time the producer, Leonard Goldstein, had died.

References

External links

1955 films
1955 comedy films
Films set in Hawaii
Films set in Washington (state)
Films set in 1952
Ma and Pa Kettle
Films directed by Lee Sholem
Films scored by Henry Mancini
American comedy films
1950s English-language films
1950s American films
American black-and-white films